The Men's madison was held on 20 October 2013.

Results

Qualification
25 teams participated over a distance of 25 km (100 laps), with sprints every 20 laps awarding 5, 3, 2 or 1 point to the first four; teams are ranked by lap gains on their opponents, then points between teams on the same lap. The top 8 teams in each heat progressed to the final.

Heat 1

Heat 2

Final
16 teams participated over a distance of 50 km (200 laps), with points awarded in the same fashion.

References

Men's madison
European Track Championships – Men's madison